Rozhen may refer to:

 Rozhen, Bulgaria, a village in Sandanski municipality, Blagoevgrad Province, Bulgaria
 Rozhen Monastery, located nearby
 Rozhen, an area in the Rhodope Mountains, in Smolyan municipality, Smolyan Province, Bulgaria
 Rozhen National Folklore Fair, organized in the area
 Rozhen Observatory, located nearby
 6267 Rozhen, an asteroid named after the observatory